Interstate 244 (I-244), also known as the Martin Luther King Jr. Memorial Expressway (in honor of Martin Luther King Jr.) since 1984, the Crosstown Expressway, and the Red Fork Expressway, is a  east–west Interstate Highway bypass route of I-44 in Tulsa, Oklahoma.

At both I-244's western and eastern terminus, the highway connects with I-44. I-244 runs from the western bank of the Arkansas River, across the river and past downtown Tulsa, before running through the northern half of the city and connecting again with I-44.

In downtown Tulsa, I-244 forms the northern and western legs of the "Inner Dispersal Loop". The southern and eastern legs are formed by the unsigned I-444 (signed as U.S. Highway 75 (US-75)).

Route description
I-244 begins at a stack interchange with I-44 (which is concurrent with State Highway 66 (SH-66) at this point) and a short segment of the Gilcrease Expressway that is disconnected from the rest of that highway. I-244 continues northeast from here, running parallel to Southwest Boulevard. Two interchanges provide access to 33rd West Avenue, 40th Place, and Southwest Boulevard. US-75 northbound then merges into I-244 eastbound at exit 2, forming a concurrency with the Interstate; US-75 south of here is a freeway headed south toward Glenpool and Okmulgee. The next three interchanges only provide partial access to the roads they link to. Exit 3A, which lacks a westbound exit ramp, provides access to Southwest Boulevard; exit 3B to 21st Street and Union Avenue and exit 4A to 17th Street and Southwest Boulevard provide only a westbound exit and eastbound entrance. North of exit 4A, I-244 and US-75 cross the Arkansas River.

Exit 4B marks I-244's entry into the Inner Dispersal Loop (IDL), a ring of freeways encircling Downtown Tulsa. At exit 4B, the southwest corner of the loop, US-75 splits away from I-244, joining I-444, which begins at this interchange and proceeds along the south and east edges of the loop. US-64 and SH-51 westbound join I-244 at this interchange, continuing along the westside of the loop with the Interstate. Two partial interchanges, exits 4C and 5A, provide access to Downtown Tulsa streets. I-244 then reaches the northwest corner of the IDL. At this point lies an interchange with two other freeways. US-64 and SH-51 split away from I-444 here to join westbound US-412, forming the Keystone Expressway. The L.L. Tisdale Parkway continues north from here. I-244 turns east from here, following the north leg of the IDL, joined by US-412 eastbound, which will overlap I-244 for the remainder of the highway. Three more exits to downtown streets are along this leg of the loop. At the northeast corner of the loop, I-244 junctions with I-444, which ends at this interchange, and US-75, which continues north toward Bartlesville. I-244 and US-412 exit the loop on an easterly course.

East of the IDL, I-244 and US-412 run generally parallel to Admiral Place. This segment of the Interstate provides access to several major north–south streets, including Lewis, Harvard, and Yale avenues. The interchanges at Sheridan Road and Memorial Drive are inverted single-point urban interchanges (SPUI) with lefthand entrance and exit ramps intersecting the surface street at a single traffic signal. East of here, I-244 intersects the Gilcrease Expressway again at its eastern terminus; this interchange also forms the eastern terminus of SH-11, which runs along the Gilcrease for its easternmost stretch. The next interchange to the east, serving Mingo Road, provides an exit for eastbound traffic and an entry to westbound traffic. I-244 then junctions with US-169, the Mingo Valley Expressway (a freeway). East of US-169 lies a parclo interchange with Garnett Road and a partial interchange, providing only an eastbound exit and westbound entrance, with 129th East Avenue. I-244 then reaches its eastern terminus at a yield sign, where it merges into eastbound I-44/SH-66. US-412 continues east along I-44.

History
I-244 was completed in December 1975. It was named the Martin Luther King Jr. Expressway east from Downtown by the Oklahoma Highway Commission in 1984. 

The spans carrying I-244/US-75 across the Arkansas River to Downtown Tulsa were built in 1967. A $78-million (equivalent to $ in ) project commenced in April 2011 to replace the westbound bridge. The new westbound bridge across the Arkansas River opened to traffic on December 19, 2012.

Work started on the new eastbound bridge on June 7, 2013. A ribbon-cutting ceremony took place on September 15, 2014, for the completion of the span.

Exit list

References

44-2
44-2
2
Transportation in Tulsa, Oklahoma
Interstate 244